Chico Anysio (born Francisco Anysio de Oliveira Paula Filho, 12 April 1931 – 23 March 2012) was a Brazilian actor, comedian, writer and composer.

Biography 

Anysio was born in Maranguape, Ceará. He moved with the family to Rio de Janeiro when he was 7 years old, and tried to work on Rádio Guanabara. Since 1968 was joined to Rede Globo, which achieved the status of a star cast that boasted the most famous artists of Brazil.

Anysio was one of the most famous Brazilian comedians of all times and is considered the greatest Brazilian comedian ever. He died on 23 March 2012, aged 80, in Samaritano Hospital, Rio de Janeiro, from multiple organ failure.

Private life 

He was the brother of actress Lupe Gigliotti, of director Zelito Viana and composer and Radio-producer Elano de Paula and father of actors Lug de Paula,  Nizo Neto and DJ Cícero Chaves, born from marriage with Regina Chaves. His last wife was the manager Malga Di Paula. Regarding religion Anysio was a vocal atheist.

Filmography

Film
1959: O Primo do Cangaceiro
1959: Mulheres à Vista
1959: Eu Sou o Tal
1959: Entrei de Gaiato .... Januário's friend
1960: Pequeno por Fora
1960: O Palhaço O Que É?
1960: Cacareco Vem Aí
1971: O Doce Esporte do Sexo
1981: O Mundo Mágico dos Trapalhões .... Narrator
1987: Tanga (Deu no New York Times?)
1996: Tieta .... Zé Esteves
2001: Trepa nas Estrelas .... Jumbo Culano
2009: Se Eu Fosse Você 2 .... Olavo
2009: Hermanoteu na Terra de Godah .... God
2009: Up – Altas Aventuras .... Carl Fredricksen (voice in Brazilian dubbing)
2009: Simonal - Ninguém Sabe o Duro que Dei .... Entrevista
2010: Os Sonhos de um Sonhador: A História de Frank Aguiar .... Alemão
2010: Uma Professora Muito Maluquinha .... Monsenhor Aristides
2011: A Hora e a Vez de Augusto Matraga .... Major Consilva (final film role)

Television

1973-1980: Chico City .... Various
1982-1990: Chico Anysio Show .... Various
1984-1993: Os Trapalhões .... Guest appearances
1989: Que Rei Sou Eu? .... Taji Namas
1990-1991: Os Trapalhões .... Supervisor Criação
1990-1992: Som Brasil ....
1990-2002: Escolinha do Professor Raimundo .... Professor Raimundo
1991: Estados Anysios de Chico City .... Various
1995: Chico Total .... Various
1995: Engraçadinha, Seus Amores e Seus Pecados .... Vendor
1999-2002: Zorra Total .... Alberto Roberto / Professor Raimundo / Dr. Rosseti
1999: Terra Nostra .... Josué Medeiros
1999: O Belo e as Feras .... Various
2002: Brava Gente .... Detective Brito / Cego
2002: Trepa nas Estrelas .... Mulambo Jambo
2004: A Diarista .... Rúbio
2005: Sítio do Picapau Amarelo .... Dr. Saraiva
2006: Sinhá Moça .... Everaldo
2007: Pé na Jaca .... Cigano
2008: Cilada .... Dep. Sandoval
2008: Guerra e Paz .... Padre Santo
2009: Caminho das Índias .... Namit Batra
2009: Chico e Amigos – .... Various
2009-2010: Zorra Total .... Alberto Roberto / Justo Veríssimo / Bento Carneiro
2011: Chico e Amigos.... Various
2011: Zorra Total .... Salomé

References

External links

 Official page

1931 births
2012 deaths
Deaths from multiple organ failure
Brazilian male film actors
Brazilian male comedians
Brazilian humorists
Brazilian atheists